Woman Cove is a settlement in Newfoundland and Labrador.

See also
List of communities in Newfoundland and Labrador

References

Populated places in Newfoundland and Labrador